Acrocephalomyia pulchra is a species of fly in the genus Acrocephalomyia of the family Ropalomeridae.

Range 
Acrocephalomyia pulchra is only known from the type locality on the Urucu River in the Amazonas region of Brazil.

References 

Diptera of South America
Insects described in 2016
Sciomyzoidea